Fight Girl is a 2018 Dutch drama film directed by Johan Timmers. In July 2019, it was shortlisted as one of the nine films in contention to be the Dutch entry for the Academy Award for Best International Feature Film at the 92nd Academy Awards, but it was not selected.

Cast
 Aiko Beemsterboer as Bo
 Hilde De Baerdemaeker as Esther
 Imanuelle Grives as Cecilia

References

External links
 

2018 films
2018 drama films
Dutch drama films
2010s Dutch-language films